The Bangladesh Medical and Dental Council (BM&DC) was formed under the Bangladesh Medical Council Act. This act was made in 1973, hence it is also called 1973 Act of Bangladesh Medical Council.  The act of 1973 was repealed in 1980 & Bangladesh Medical & Dental Council Act was passed by the parliament on 9th April, 1980.

It is located in the capital of Bangladesh, Dhaka in 203, Shaheed Sayed Nazrul Islam Sarani (86, Bijoy Nagar). Its function is to give registration to MBBS, BDS & DMF to practice medicine and dentistry in Bangladesh. It maintains the official register of  Medical Practitioner, Dental Practitioner & Medical Assistant Practitioner within Bangladesh. Its chief responsibility is to "protect, promote and maintain the health and safety of the public" by controlling entry to the register, and suspending or removing members when necessary. It also sets the standards for medical colleges in Bangladesh. Unregistered, suspended or removed members are not allowed to practice medicine in Bangladesh.

The Bangladesh Medical & Dental Council is the regulatory authority and the custodian of medical and dental basic and higher education in Bangladesh.

See also
 List of medical schools in Bangladesh
 List of dental schools in Bangladesh

Bangladesh Medical and Dental Council doctors list

References

External links
 

Medical and health organisations based in Bangladesh
Organizations established in 1980
1980 establishments in Bangladesh
Organisations based in Dhaka
Dental organizations